Edward Clarence Levy (né Whitner; October 28, 1916 – October 27, 2008) was a left fielder/first baseman in Major League Baseball who played between  and  for the Philadelphia Phillies (1940) and New York Yankees (1944). Listed at 6' 5.5", 190 lb., he batted and threw right-handed. 
 
A native of Birmingham, Alabama, Levy was one of many major leaguers who saw his baseball career interrupted by World War II: he served in the US Coast Guard. He played parts of three seasons: he appeared in just one game in 1940 for the Philadelphia Phillies and subsequently joined the New York Yankees for two brief stints in April 1942 and April through June, 1944. He appeared in the opening day starting lineup both years. He posted a .215 batting average (42–for–195) with four home runs and 32 RBI in 54 games played, including 17 runs, 11 doubles, two triples, and two stolen bases. As a fielder, he appeared in 36 games at left field and 13 on first base. In June 1944, he was traded to a minor league team, the American Association's Milwaukee Brewers and he never returned to the majors.

References
Baseball Reference
Retrosheet
Baseball in Wartime
Ed Levy's obituary

New York Yankees players
Philadelphia Phillies players
Major League Baseball first basemen
Major League Baseball left fielders
United States Coast Guard personnel of World War II
Baseball players from Alabama
1916 births
2008 deaths